Declan Lonergan (born 25 July 1969) was an Irish cyclist. He won the Rás Tailteann in 1994.

Career
Lonergan won the Rás Tailteann in 1994.

Lonergan competed in the points race at the 1996 Summer Olympics, finishing 22nd, and also competed in the 1996 UCI Track Cycling World Cup Classics.

References

External links

living people
1969 births
Irish male cyclists
Rás Tailteann winners
Olympic cyclists of Ireland
Cyclists at the 1996 Summer Olympics